Vladimir Kharin may refer to:

 Vladimir Kharin (footballer) (born 1964), Russian football player
 Vladimir Kharin (zoologist) (1957–2013), Russian zoologist, ichthyologist, herpetologist